FK Mlekar is a football club based in village of Malo Konjari near Prilep, Republic of Macedonia. They currently play in the OFS Prilep Division B.

History
The club was founded in 1957.

References

External links
Mlekar Facebook 
Club info at MacedonianFootball 
Football Federation of Macedonia 

Mlekar
Association football clubs established in 1957
1957 establishments in the Socialist Republic of Macedonia
FK